Britain Dalton (born December 12, 2001) is an American actor known for his role as Lo’ak, the second son of Jake Sully and Neytiri, in the science fiction film Avatar: The Way of Water (2022) and with three sequels as the narrator.

Life and career
Dalton filmed Avatar: The Way of Water and Avatar 3 with director James Cameron.

Filmography

Film

Television

Video games

References

External links
 
 Britain Dalton

American male child actors
American male film actors
American male television actors
American male video game actors
Living people
21st-century American male actors
Place of birth missing (living people)
Year of birth missing (living people)
American male voice actors